The following is a list of films originally produced by Celluloid Dreams and released in the 2020s.

Films

References 

French films by studio
2020s in film
Lists of 2020s films